Joseph Carroll was an English professional footballer who played as a left half.

Career
Carroll played for Bradford City between 1919 and 1920. For Bradford City, he made 1 appearance in the Football League.

Sources

References

Year of birth missing
Year of death missing
English footballers
Bradford City A.F.C. players
English Football League players
Association football wing halves